Another Lonely Night may refer to:

 "Another Lonely Night" (Adam Lambert song), 2015
 "Another Lonely Night" (Jean Shepard song), 1970